Oconee Fall Line Technical College (OFTC) is a public community college with its main campuses in Sandersville and Dublin, Georgia.  It is part of the Technical College System of Georgia and provides education services for an eleven-county service area in central and eastern Georgia. The school's service area includes Bleckley, Dodge, Glascock, Hancock, Jefferson, Laurens, Telfair, Warren, Washington, Wheeler, and Wilkinson counties.  OFTC is accredited by the Accrediting Commission of the Council on Occupational Education.

OFTC was created on July 1, 2011, as a result of the merger of Sandersville Technical College and Heart of Georgia Technical College.  The merger was part of a statewide plan to reduce costs in the Technical College System of Georgia.

The school has two primary campuses, which were formerly the main campuses of its predecessor institutions. The campus in Sandersville is known as "north campus" and the campus in Dublin is known as "south campus." The school also maintains extension centers in Sparta, Louisville, Sandersville, McRae-Helena, and Eastman.

References

External links
 Official website

Educational institutions established in 2011
Technical College System of Georgia
Education in Bleckley County, Georgia
Education in Dodge County, Georgia
Education in Glascock County, Georgia
Education in Hancock County, Georgia
Education in Jefferson County, Georgia
Education in Laurens County, Georgia
Education in Telfair County, Georgia
Education in Warren County, Georgia
Education in Washington County, Georgia
Education in Wheeler County, Georgia
Education in Wilkinson County, Georgia
Buildings and structures in Washington County, Georgia
Buildings and structures in Laurens County, Georgia
Educational institutions accredited by the Council on Occupational Education
2011 establishments in Georgia (U.S. state)